Yogi Akhileshwar Das is a politician from the Bharatiya Janata Party from Sheohar Lok Sabha.